General elections were held in Libya to elect the House of Representatives on 17 January 1960.

Conduct
The country was divided into 55 constituencies for the election. The majority of constituencies were contested by two or more candidates, although as political parties were banned at the time, all candidates were independents. It was the first election in which secret balloting was used nationwide, as previously it had been confined to urban areas.

Results
Prime Minister Abdul Majid Kubar and all other ministers were re-elected, but the Speaker of the Parliament Salim al-Qadi lost his seat. Following the elections, al-Qadi was appointed Minister of Education, replacing Bubakir Naama, who became Governor of Tripolitania. Ahmed al-Hasairi replaced Ibrahim Bin Shaban as Minister of Defence, whilst Bin Shaban was appointed as "Ambassador at large". Minister of Economics Rajab Bin Katu became Minister of Health, swapping portfolios with Mohammed Bin Othman. Abd al-Hamid Daibani remained Minister of Justice, Nasr al-Kizza remained Minister of Communications and Wahbi al-Bouri remained Minister of State.

References

Libyan general election
Elections in Libya
General election
Libyan general election
Non-partisan elections